Johann Bernhard Fischer (1685, Lübeck – 1772, Hinterbergen near Riga) was a doctor of German origin in Imperial Russian service as medical adviser to the Empress Anna.

Biography
Fischer was brought up in Riga (now Latvia). After studying in Germany and the Netherlands and travelling in western Europe he returned to Riga as a physician. For eight years (1734–42) he was medical adviser to the Empress Anna.

In 1742 Fischer retired from state service and settled in his estate Hinterbergen near Riga. Here he wrote an account of his life Der In Beruhigung und Friede wohnende Montan (1745), in which title the capitals I, B, and F represent his initials. He also wrote verse idylls Empfindungen des Frühlings (1750), Hirtenlieder und Gedichte (1753), Daphnis an Silen (1754).

References 

People from Livonia
18th-century physicians from the Russian Empire
1685 births
1772 deaths
People from the Russian Empire of German descent